Steven Regier (born August 31, 1984) is a Canadian former professional hockey forward. He last played with the Thomas Sabo Ice Tigers of the Deutsche Eishockey Liga (DEL).

Playing career
Regier was born in Edmonton, Alberta. He was drafted by the New York Islanders in the 5th round, 148th overall from the Medicine Hat Tigers of the WHL. Regier made his pro debut with the Bridgeport Sound Tigers in the 2004–05 season and made his NHL debut with the Islanders on the 2005–06 season.

On July 15, 2008, Regier was signed by the St. Louis Blues as an unrestricted free agent. On November 16, 2008, Regier was called up to join the Blues. He scored his first two NHL goals in his first game as a St. Louis Blue that evening, scoring the Blues' only goals against the Montreal Canadiens in a 3-2 shootout loss.

After four seasons with the EC Red Bull Salzburg organization in the Austrian EBEL, Regier left as a free agent and signed a one-year contract to remain in Europe with the Thomas Sabo Ice Tigers of the German DEL on May 2, 2013.

Career statistics

References

External links

1984 births
Living people
Bridgeport Sound Tigers players
Canadian ice hockey left wingers
EC Red Bull Salzburg players
Medicine Hat Tigers players
New York Islanders draft picks
New York Islanders players
Peoria Rivermen (AHL) players
St. Louis Blues players
Ice hockey people from Edmonton
Canadian expatriate ice hockey players in Austria